Mytnik is a rural locality (a village) in Beketovskoye Rural Settlement, Vozhegodsky District, Vologda Oblast, Russia. The population was 32 as of 2002.

Geography 
Mytnik is located 79 km southwest of Vozhega (the district's administrative centre) by road. Tigino is the nearest rural locality.

References 

Rural localities in Vozhegodsky District